Sarwar Hussain (born 15 April 1949) is an Indian politician. He was a member of 9th Lok Sabha from Bulandshahr constituency. He served as Union Minister of State in Ministry of Food and Civil Supplies in Chandra Shekhar cabinet from November 1990 to February 1991.

In November 1990, he was one of the 64 MPs who left Janata Dal and formed Chandra Shekhar government.

References 

1949 births
India MPs 1989–1991
Janata Party politicians
Janata Dal politicians
Members of the Cabinet of India
Uttar Pradesh politicians
Living people
Samajwadi Party politicians from Uttar Pradesh